Wu Zheng may refer to:

Bruno Wu (born 1966), Chinese entrepreneur. His surname is Wu.
Zheng Wu (born 1967), Chinese basketball player. His surname is Zheng.